Tetratheca fasciculata, also known as Cronin's Tetratheca, is an extinct species of plant in the quandong family that was endemic to Australia.

Description
The species grew as a compact shrub less than 20 cm in height. The flowers were pink.

Distribution and habitat
The plant was collected only twice, in the late 19th century, from the Wagin area about 230 km south-east of Perth, in the Avon Wheatbelt IBRA bioregion of south-west Western Australia.

References

fasciculata
Eudicots of Western Australia
Oxalidales of Australia
Taxa named by Joy Thompson
Plants described in 1976